The Supreme Commander (acronym: ÖB) is the highest ranked professional military officer in the Swedish Armed Forces, and is by NATO terminology the Swedish chief of defence equivalent. The Supreme Commander is the agency head of the Swedish Armed Forces and formally reports to the Government of Sweden, though normally through the Minister for Defence. The primary responsibilities and duties of the Supreme Commander (and the charter for the Armed Forces) are prescribed in an ordinance issued by the Government.

The Supreme Commander is, apart from the honorary ranks held by the King of Sweden and in the past other members of the Swedish Royal Family, by unwritten convention normally the only professional military officer on active duty to hold the highest rank (a four-star General or Admiral). An exception was made 2009-2014 when Håkan Syrén was chairman of the European Union Military Committee.

The present Supreme Commander, General Micael Bydén, took office on 1 October 2015.

History
Before the modern era, the King was expected to command the forces himself; not seldom on location during war campaigns as shown by Gustavus Adolphus, Charles X, Charles XI and Charles XII. This remained the case formally until the 20th century. From the late 19th century onwards, there were no service chiefs of the Army or Navy; all senior service commanders reported directly to the King in Council. Apart from a single Minister for Defence created in 1919 by merging the position of ministers of the land forces and naval forces, no joint command structure existed.

In 1936, a Supreme Commander was intended to be appointed in war-time-only, and on 1 December 1939, during World War II, the first Supreme Commander, General Olof Thörnell, was appointed. In 1942 it was decided to keep this office even after the end of the war. The Supreme Commander would in wartime formally report to the King in Council until the enactment of the new Instrument of Government in 1974, and after 1 January 1975 to the Government.

Heraldry
The coat of arms of the Supreme Commander was used from 1991 to 1993. It has since 1993 been used by the Swedish Armed Forces and was used from 1994 to 2001 by the Swedish Armed Forces Headquarters. Blazon: "Azure, lesser coat of arms of Sweden, three open crowns or placed two and one. The shield surmounting an erect sword of the last colour".

The command flag of the Supreme Commander is drawn by Brita Grep and embroidered by hand by the Kedja studio, Heraldica. Blazon: "Fessed in blue and yellow; on blue three open yellow crowns placed two and one, on yellow two blue batons of command with sets of open yellow crowns placed two and one in saltire."

List of Supreme Commanders

Timeline 

Every time a new Supreme Commander is to be appointed, there is some debate between the different services. Some feel that some kind of rotational system would be appropriate. In actuality, most Supreme Commanders have come from the Army, and only one, Håkan Syrén, from the Navy. Because he is a General of the Amphibious Corps, there has to this day not been a single Admiral to hold the office.

List of Deputy Supreme Commanders
Until 30 June 1994, the Chief of the Defence Staff was the second most senior member of the Swedish Armed Forces. When the Swedish Armed Forces was reorganized on 1 July 1994, the Chief of the Defence Staff position was abolished. Lieutenant General Percurt Green became the first Deputy Supreme Commander who took office on 1 July 1994. He also held the post of head of the Joint Operations Command (Operationsledningen, OpL).

In conjunction with the Swedish Armed Forces Headquarters reorganization in 1998, a special position was created as Deputy Supreme Commander to relieve the Supreme Commander. The Deputy Supreme Commander led the Headquarters work through coordination of the operations. He also exercised employer responsibility for the staff in the Headquarters. In order to coordinate the operations he had a Coordination Department. The Deputy Supreme Commander also acted as the Deputy Agency Executive (Ställföreträdande myndighetschef). A formal position of head of the Swedish Armed Forces Headquarters was established in 2002.

From 1 October 2005, the post of Deputy Supreme Commander became the Director General of the Swedish Armed Forces held by a civil servant.

See also
 Lord High Admiral of Sweden (historical antecedent)
 Lord High Constable of Sweden (historical antecedent)

Footnotes

References

Notes

Print

External links
 

Military appointments of Sweden

Sweden
Heads of Swedish State agencies
1939 establishments in Sweden